Club Deportivo Las Palmas (sometimes referred as Las Palmas) is a Peruvian football club, playing in the city of Chota, Cajamarca, Peru.

History

The Club Deportivo Las Palmas was founded on November 25, 2016.

In the 2017 Copa Perú, the club classified to the National Stage, but was eliminated by Diablos Rojos (HV) in the Quarterfinals.

In the 2018 Copa Perú, the club classified to the National Stage, but was eliminated by UDA in the Quarterfinals.

In the 2019 Copa Perú, the club classified to the National Stage, but was eliminated by Deportivo Llacuabamba in the Round of 16.

In the 2021 Copa Perú, the club classified to the National Stage, but was eliminated by UDP in the Fase 2 - Interregional.

Honours

Regional
Liga Departamental de Cajamarca:
Winners (2): 2018, 2019
Runner-up (1): 2017

Liga Provincial de Chota:
Winners (2): 2017, 2022

Liga Distrital de Chota:
Runner-up (1): 2017

See also
List of football clubs in Peru
Peruvian football league system

References

External links

Football clubs in Peru
Association football clubs established in 2016
2016 establishments in Peru